The women's 5000 metres at the 2004 Summer Olympics as part of the athletics program were held at the Athens Olympic Stadium on August 20 and 23.

The final started out slowly and dismally, as none of the entrants wanted to take the lead. With the tightly packed field passing through the 400 metres, many runners started to fall behind and could not handle the pace set by early leaders Sun Yingjie and Xing Huina. Approaching to the halfway mark of the race, Turkey's world-record holder Elvan Abeylegesse surpassed the Chinese duo to charge into the lead and the pace began to accelerate quickly. Ethiopia's Meseret Defar and Kenya's Isabella Ochichi came immediately to the front of the pack, keeping an eye on the leader. With only three laps to go, Abeylegesse struggled to maintain her pace until she finally faded on the backstretch, leaving Defar and Ochichi to exchange the leading duties throughout the race and battle out for the gold. Moments after the bell, Ochichi continued to lead from the rest of the field, but Defar patiently passed her with only 200 metres to go, and then stormed away to her first Olympic title, finishing at 14:45.65. Ochichi had nothing left to respond with, but came through behind her to get the silver, while Defar's teammate Tirunesh Dibaba overhauled the weary Abeylegesse to hold on for the bronze.

Records
, the existing World and Olympic records were as follows.

No new records were set during the competition.

Qualification
The qualification period for athletics was 1 January 2003 to 9 August 2004. For the women's 5000 metres, each National Olympic Committee was permitted to enter up to three athletes that had run the race in 15:08.70 or faster during the qualification period. If an NOC had no athletes that qualified under that standard, one athlete that had run the race in 15:20.45 or faster could be entered.

Schedule
All times are Greece Standard Time (UTC+2)

Results

Round 1
Qualification rule: The first five finishers in each heat (Q) plus the next five fastest overall runners (q) advanced to the final.

Heat 1

Heat 2

Final

References

External links
 IAAF Athens 2004 Olympic Coverage

W
5000 metres at the Olympics
2004 in women's athletics
Women's events at the 2004 Summer Olympics